Lipstick Traces may refer to:

"Lipstick Traces (On A Cigarette)", a song first recorded by New Orleans singer Benny Spellman
Lipstick Traces: A Secret History of the 20th Century, a non-fiction book by American rock-music critic Greil Marcus
Lipstick Traces (A Secret History of Manic Street Preachers), a Manic Street Preachers album
"Lipstick Traces", an instrumental track by UFO from the 1974 album Phenomenon